This Must be Love is the fourth independently released album from Los Angeles, California pop/rock band The 88. The album spawned one single release, "Love Is the Thing".

Track listing
 Go to Heaven
 Heartsick Town
 Bad Love
 This Must Be Love
 After All
 Love Is the Thing
 Carnival Music
 Nigel
 One of These Days
 Yours Tonight
 I'll Follow You
 Let Me Go
 Who Is This

References

External links
 https://itunes.apple.com/au/album/this-must-be-love/id345150484

The 88 albums
2010 albums